Gary Piggott (born 1 April 1969) is an English former professional footballer who played as a forward.

References

Living people
Footballers from Birmingham, West Midlands
English footballers
Association football forwards
Dudley Town F.C. players
West Bromwich Albion F.C. players
Shrewsbury Town F.C. players
Willenhall Town F.C. players
Tamworth F.C. players
English Football League players
1969 births